Laura Pomeroy (born 19 December 1983) is a Canadian swimmer.

Career
Pomeroy represented Canada at the 2002 Commonwealth Games in Manchester where she won bronze in the 4 × 100 m freestyle relay alongside Laura Nicholls, Marianne Limpert and Jessica Deglau in 3:45.33. In other results, Pomeroy finished 5th in the 50 m freestyle in 25.99 and 12th in the 100 m freestyle in 57.48.

References

1983 births
Living people
Canadian female freestyle swimmers
Commonwealth Games bronze medallists for Canada
Swimmers at the 2002 Commonwealth Games
Commonwealth Games medallists in swimming
Place of birth missing (living people)
Medallists at the 2002 Commonwealth Games